The Mokelumne River AVA is an American Viticultural Area located in San Joaquin County, California. It is located in the southwest part of the larger Lodi AVA, and includes the city of Lodi and the towns of Woodbridge and Acampo. The AVA is named after the Mokelumne River, which drains out of the Sierra Nevada Mountains into the San Joaquin River and passes through the heart of the appellation. The wine region includes a portion of the lower Mokelumne River and the Cosumnes River, a tributary. The soil in the area is alluvial fan deposits of sand and loam. Ample rainfall and soil moisture retention allows most grape growers to farm without the use of irrigation.

See also
Mokelumne River

References

American Viticultural Areas of California
Geography of San Joaquin County, California
Geography of the San Joaquin Valley
Mokelumne River
2006 establishments in California
American Viticultural Areas